Celebrity Fat Fighters is a reality weight-loss television program, originally shown in January 2017 on the UK channel TLC.

The show sees Galia Grainger, who owns a weight loss camp near Battle, Sussex, working with seven celebrities, enforcing a 400 calorie diet and strict training regime. The series will have three episodes aired in January 2017.

The celebrities taking part are:

 Sandi Bogle (from Gogglebox)
 Jennifer Ellison (from Brookside)
 James Bennewith (from The Only Way is Essex)
 Stevi Ritchie (from The X Factor)
 Lateysha Grace (from Big Brother and The Valleys)
 Riley Carter Millington (from EastEnders) 
 Danny Miles (comedian)

References

External links
 Celebrity Fat Fighters

2017 British television series debuts
2017 British television series endings
English-language television shows
Fitness reality television series
2010s British reality television series